Adrastus of Cyzicus is an individual who is mentioned along with Dion of Naples in a work of Augustine of Hippo. He was apparently an ancient Roman  astronomer. Although, from Augustine's brief and second-hand account, we can know very little of his life or works, he was cited as an authoritative astronomical observer from antiquity.

According to Augustine's De Civitate Dei contra Paganos, Varro (116 BC – 27 BC) the Roman scholar and writer, cited Adrastus and Dion as authorities for the dating of an astronomical phenomenon involving Venus, describing them as mathematici nobiles (distinguished astronomers, or possibly astrologers). Again according to Augustine, Varro recorded this in his work De gente populi Romani. Although Varro's writing is now lost, Augustine quoted from it:

Augustine used these ancient astronomical reports to further his what has been called his "epistemic theory of miracles". Here, Augustine argued that if Varro called the phenomenon that Adrastus and Dion reported, a "portent", then it could not be contrary to nature, but must simply be inexplicable under our current understanding of nature.

In antiquity, Cyzicus was an important commercial town in Mysia in Anatolia.

References

External links

Ancient Roman astronomers